Sir John Malcolm Sabine Pasley, 5th Baronet, FBA (5 April 1926 – 4 March 2004), commonly known as Malcolm Pasley, was a British philologist affiliated with the University of Oxford. He was considered the foremost British authority of German studies. Pasley is particularly well known for his dedication to and publication of the works of Franz Kafka.

Biography

Early life

Born in Rajkot, India, Pasley was educated at Sherborne. He was a direct descendant of Admiral Sir Thomas Pasley, 1st Baronet, who distinguished himself in the French Revolutionary Wars and was made a baronet in 1794.

He served in the Royal Navy between 1944 and 1946.

Academics and honors
Following is the outline of the academic career of Sir Malcolm Pasley:

1947: Attended Trinity College, Oxford
1949: Graduated with a First in Modern Languages
1949-50: Laming Travelling Fellow at The Queen's College, Oxford
1950-58: Appointed Lecturer in German at Brasenose and Magdalen Colleges (University of Oxford)
1958-86: Emeritus Fellow, Magdalen College
1979-80: Vice-President, Magdalen College
1980: Honorary doctorate from the University of Giessen
1982: Succeeded to the family baronetcy
1983: Elected to the German Academy of Language and Literature in Darmstadt
1986: Retired
1987: Austrian Cross of Honour for Learning and the Arts
1991: Fellowship of the British Academy

Marriage and children
Sir Malcolm Pasley was married in 1965 to Virginia Wait. They had two sons:
 Robert Killigrew Sabine Pasley, born 25 October 1965 
 Humphrey Sabine Pasley, born 1967

German language
Pasley wrote of many German authors, with his initial works on the German language, Nietzsche in particular, gaining him much fame. Pasley's work in this area was pioneering; his book Germany: A Companion to German Studies, first published in 1972, is still in heavy demand.

Kafka
Pasley is best known for his work on the Kafka writings.  He began studying Kafka in the early part of his career and was introduced to Marianne Steiner born Pollak, Kafka's niece and daughter of his sister Valli, by her son Michael, who was a student at Oxford.  Through this friendship Pasley became the key adviser to Kafka's heirs.  Pasley regarded Kafka as "a younger brother".

In 1956, Salman Schocken and Max Brod placed Kafka's works in a Swiss vault due to concerns surrounding unrest in the Middle East and the safety of the manuscripts, which were with Brod in Tel Aviv. After significant negotiation, Pasley took personal possession of Kafka's works that were in Brod's possession. In 1961, Pasley transported them by car from Switzerland to Oxford. Pasley reflected on the adventure as one that "made his own hair stand on end".

The papers, except The Trial, were deposited in Oxford's Bodleian Library. The Trial remained in the possession of Brod heiress Ilse Ester Hoffe, and in November 1988 the German Literary Archives at Marbach, Germany purchased the manuscript for £1.1 million in an auction conducted by Sotheby's.

At Oxford, Pasley headed a team of scholars (Gerhard Neumann, Jost Schillemeit, and Jürgen Born) that recompiled the text, removed Max Brod's edits and changes, and began publishing the works in 1982.  This team restored the original German text to its full (and in some cases incomplete) state, with special attention paid to the unique Kafka punctuation, considered to be critical to his style.

Criticism of Pasley's work on Kafka
Subsequent to the publication of the Kafka works, Pasley began receiving criticism about the completeness of their German publication. To that end, Stroemfeld Verlag has requested permission to scan the manuscripts to produce a facsimile edition and CD-ROM.

Aside from completeness, they cited a concern for the preservation of the works; some were written in pencil, and many were fading and crumbling.

Pasley refused their requests, joined by Marianne Steiner, who in 1998, told The Observer "I cannot forgive them for [the terrible things they had said about Pasley. I do not want them to have anything to do with the manuscripts."

In April 1998, Stroemfeld published a facsimile version of The Trial. This manuscript, being owned by the German government, was accessible to them. In this publication the manuscript and transcription are listed side by side.

Scholars in favor of the Stroemfeld editions include Jeremy Adler, professor of German at King's College London, American writers Louis Begley and Harold Bloom, professor of Humanities at Yale.

Works

Published works
1965 Kafka-Symposion, co-author with Klaus Wagenbach
1972 Germany: a companion to German studies (second edition, 1982) 
1978 Nietzsche: Imagery and Thought, 
1982 Das Schloß (The Castle) 
1987/89 Max Brod, Franz Kafka: eine Freundschaft
1990 Der Prozeß (The Trial) 
1990 Reise- Tagebucher, Kafka's travel diaries
1991 Die Handschrift redet (The Manuscript Talks)
1991 The Great Wall of China and Other Stories
1992 The Transformation and Other Stories 
1993 Nachgelassene Schriften und Fragmente I
1995 Die Schrift ist unveränderlich (The Script is Unchangeable)
1996 Judgment & In the Penal Colony

References

Sources

See also

1926 births
2004 deaths
Pasley, Malcolm, 5th Baronet
Franz Kafka scholars
Germanists
Military personnel of British India
Translators of Franz Kafka
Royal Navy officers of World War II
Alumni of Trinity College, Oxford
Fellows of The Queen's College, Oxford
Fellows of Magdalen College, Oxford
Fellows of the British Academy
People educated at Sherborne School
20th-century translators